Foggia "Gino Lisa" Airport  is an airport serving Foggia, Italy. Its name commemorates the Italian aviator  (1896-1917).

Facilities

Helicopter service
Foggia airport serves as a hub for the Italian airline Alidaunia, which has a terminal for its flights to Tremiti Islands. Alidaunia also provides a flying school, a maintenance hangar, and the rescue service in Apulia.

Airlines and destinations
The following airlines operate regular scheduled and charter flights at Foggia Airport:

Statistics

References

External links

 Official website
  Aero Club Foggia
  Mondo Gino Lisa - blog sull'Aeroporto Gino Lisa di Foggia
  Foggia Airport Information
 
 

Airports in Apulia